Runes of Magic (RoM) is a massively multiplayer online role-playing game (MMORPG) developed by the Taiwanese developer Runewaker Entertainment and adapted for the English and German-speaking market by German company Frogster Interactive.  Frogster has also opened servers for France, Spain, Poland, Italy, and Australia as well as servers dedicated to the European Union.  After going through an open beta phase, the game was launched on March 19, 2009, and Chapter II – The Elven Prophecy was launched on September 15, 2009. The next chapter, Chapter III – The Elder Kingdoms, started April 22, 2010, however all of Chapter III did not become available until August 11, 2010. Chapter IV - Lands of Despair, was released June 16, 2011. The latest Chapter, Chapter V - Fires of Shadowforge, was released on June 12, 2012. The game client is free to download, and no monthly subscription fee is required because the service is funded by real money transactions (RMT) in the Runes of Magic Item Shop.

The game was later acquired by Gameforge when the company bought 60 percent of Frogster Interactive's stake.

Reception 

Runes of Magic won the German Game Developer Award for Best International PC Game of 2009.  It also won nine awards in Massively's Reader's Choice and Staff Choice Awards in that same year,

In 2010, Runes of Magic was awarded for the second year in a row the German Game Developers Award for Best Online Game of 2010.

References

External links
 Official Site of Gameforge

2009 video games
Active massively multiplayer online games
Lua (programming language)-scripted video games
Massively multiplayer online role-playing games
Video games developed in Taiwan
Windows games
Windows-only games
Gameforge games
Frogster Interactive Pictures games